Respect the Pimpin' is the first EP by American rapper Too Short. The EP contains mostly themes of pimping. It was released on December 14, 2010 by Up All Night Entertainment and Empire Distribution. The project was released solely digital like his 2010 album Still Blowin'.

Singles 
The song "Bitch I'm a Pimp" was released to the internet before the EP's release to generate interest and promote it.

Track listing

References 

2010 debut EPs
Too Short albums
Albums produced by Jazze Pha
Empire Distribution EPs